Joseph Stroud (born 1943, Glendale, California) is an American poet.

Life
He was educated at the University of San Francisco, California State University at Los Angeles, and San Francisco State University. He is currently retired from teaching at Cabrillo College.

He has published five collections of poetry, most recently Of This World; New and Selected Poems (Copper Canyon Press, 2008) and Country of Light (Copper Canyon Press, 2004). His work earned a Pushcart Prize in 2000 and has been featured on Garrison Keillor's Writer's Almanac. He was also a finalist for the Northern California Book Critics Award in 2005 and a year later was selected for a Witter Bynner Fellowship in poetry from the Library of Congress. His poetry articulates a voyage through places and times and voices, often sifting through the details of daily life, searching for miracles (“Inside the pear there’s a paradise we will never know, our only hint the sweetness of its taste.” - Comice, Below Cold Mountain).

He divides his time between his home in Santa Cruz, California, and a cabin in the Sierra Nevada.

Awards
 2000 Pushcart Prize
 2005 finalist for the Northern California Book Critics Award
 2006 Witter Bynner Fellowship in poetry from the Library of Congress.
 2011 Arts and Letters Award in Literature from the American Academy of Arts and Letters.

Works

Anthologies

References

Living people
American male poets
University of San Francisco alumni
San Francisco State University alumni
Writers from Glendale, California
California State University, Los Angeles alumni
1943 births